The Helpmann Award for Best Performance in an Australian Contemporary Concert was an award, presented by Live Performance Australia (LPA) at the annual Helpmann Awards from 2005-2008. In the following list winners are listed first and marked in gold, in boldface, and the nominees are listed below with no highlight.

Winners and nominees

Source:

See also
Helpmann Awards

References

External links
The official Helpmann Awards website

C